Tom On Mars is a 2005 16mm black and white science fiction film directed by Andrei Severny and starring Laila Lemhadden, Russel Smith, and Peter DuPre. The seven-minute love-story of Tom and Maria is based on a number of real-life cases of dangerous psychological challenges experienced by astronauts during long space assignments or by researchers staying in remote areas such as Antarctica.

The film was part of the official selection at Festival de Nationen in Austria, International Science Film Festival in Hungary, Filmstock Film Festival in UK, West Chester Short Film Festival, Red Shift Film Festival and Festival of Cinema and Technology in the United States. The film was shot on location in New York City.

Synopsis
Tom is the astronaut who in 2049 goes on the second mission to Mars. Just a few days before the start of his mission he meets the love of his life - Maria. Going further away from Earth during his complex and risky space travel Tom starts to experience serious psychological difficulties. Close confinement, isolation and inability to remain in touch with Maria make him shut down communications with the mission control. The enduring test does not finish even upon his return from a 70 million-miles journey.

References

External links
 Official website
 Tom on Mars on Vimeo
 

2005 films
2005 science fiction films
Films about astronauts
Mars in film
Films directed by Andrei Severny (filmmaker)
Films shot in New York City
American black-and-white films
American science fiction short films
2000s English-language films
2000s American films